Boston and Maine No. 3713, also known as the "Constitution", is the sole survivor of the "P-4a" class 4-6-2 "Heavy Pacific" type steam locomotives. It was built by the Lima Locomotive Works for the Boston and Maine Railroad in December 1934. As of 2022, the No. 3713 locomotive is currently being restored to operating condition at the Steamtown National Historic Site in Scranton, Pennsylvania as part of their operating fleet for use on excursion trains. It was the focus of Project 3713, a partnership between the National Park Service and the Lackawanna & Wyoming Valley Railway Historical Society.

History

Design, namings, and revenue service
No. 3713 was the fourth member of five "P-4a" class heavy 4-6-2 Pacifics (Nos. 3710-3714) ordered by the Boston and Maine (B&M) in December 1934 at the Lima Locomotive Works (LLW) in Lima, Ohio, at a cost of $100,000. These locomotives were originally built with smoke deflectors, a single air compressor mounted on their pilot deck, and a metal sky-lining shroud covering up the top of their boiler thus giving them a semi-streamlined appearance. In 1936, the B&M ordered the final batch of five Pacifics (Nos. 3715-3719) which were delivered in March 1937 as the last Pacifics to be built by Lima. Slightly classified as P-4b, they were delivered with smoke deflectors but without the sky-lining shroud.

Designed with  driving wheels, a larger firebox, and a massive boiler, the P-4 Heavy Pacifics would easily cruise at a speed of 70 miles per hour, carrying enough coal to pull a 14-car train for about 250 miles, and enough water to last about 125 miles. During World War II, all of the P-4s had their sky-lining shrouds and smoke deflectors removed for easier maintenance. Around 1944 or 1945, a second air compressor was added on all of the locomotives' pilot deck. They were assigned to haul B&M's high priority passenger trains such as the Minute Man, Alouette, Red Wing, and Flying Yankee all over the New England states. 

The B&M sponsored the New England students a contest to give all five P-4a and five other P-4b names. On December 11, 1937, No. 3713 was officially named The Constitution by J. Schumann Moore, a 14-year-old student from Eastern High School in Lynn, Massachusetts. Between 1940 and 1941, other winning names were selected to P-4a Pacifics No. 3710 as Peter Cooper, No. 3711 as Allagash, No. 3712 as East Wind, and No. 3714 as Greylock. While the P-4b Pacifics Nos. 3715 to 3719 were also named Kwasind, Rogers’ Rangers, Old North Bridge, Ye Salem Witch, and Camel’s Hump, respectively. Each locomotive all has a plaque representing the students' name and their respective educated school.

Retirement and preservation
After being withdrawn from passenger duties by newer diesel locomotives in the mid 1950s, No. 3713 became a stationary boiler to melt the snow and heat the passenger cars at the North Station terminal in Boston, Massachusetts. It was recalled to road service to cover for diesel locomotives during a flood, presumably in relation with the events of Hurricane Diane which affected the area at that time. On April 22, 1956, No. 3713 ran the Farwell To Steam excursion round trip between Boston and Portland, Maine, marking the end of steam operations on the B&M, and was officially retired from revenue service in July 1956. 

On June 11, 1958, the No. 3713 locomotive was purchased by New England millionaire F. Nelson Blount as part of his Steamtown, U.S.A. collection at the Edaville Railroad in South Carver, Massachusetts, then Pleasure Island park in Wakefield, Massachusetts, before it was moved to North Walpole, New Hampshire in 1961, and finally Bellows Falls, Vermont in 1964. In October 1969, the No. 3713 was loaned to Museum of Science in Boston with a cosmetic repaint to make the locomotive look presentable to the general public. Afterwards, No. 3713 returned to Steamtown in the mid 1970s and was eventually moved along with the rest of the collection to the new location of Steamtown in Scranton, Pennsylvania.

Restoration
Since 1995, the No. 3173 locomotive is currently being restored to operating condition through a partnership with the Lackawanna & Wyoming Valley Railway Historical Society. The estimated restoration work cost was $1.4 million, which required repairs to the boiler, air compressors, feedwater heater, and pilot truck. During 2011, the No. 3713 locomotive received new firebox grates, sheets, and thermic siphons, which were fabricated by Diversified Rail Services. In October 2017, the driving wheels were sent to be repaired by the Strasburg Rail Road (SRC) in Strasburg, Pennsylvania for crankpin and axle work until they returned to Steamtown in spring 2019. In late August 2018, Steamtown gave the SRC a $148,600 contract to build a brand new firebox for the No. 3713 locomotive. In October 2018, No. 3713 received three new safety valves, which were built by the SRC. In October 2019, the new firebox arrived at Steamtown and installed on the No. 3713 locomotive. Once restored to operating condition, No. 3713 will eventually become the replacement for Canadian National 3254.

Gallery

See also 
 Baldwin Locomotive Works 26
 Canadian Pacific 2317
 Nickel Plate Road 759

Notes

References

Bibliography

Further reading

External links

 Project3713

4-6-2 locomotives
Individual locomotives of the United States
Lima locomotives
Railway locomotives introduced in 1934
Standard gauge locomotives of the United States
Preserved steam locomotives of Pennsylvania